Aksel Hroar Gresvig (born 21 November 1941) is a Norwegian competitive sailor. He was born in Oslo. He competed at the 1972 Summer Olympics in Munich, in the Tempest class.

References

External links
 
 
 

1941 births
Living people
Sportspeople from Oslo
Norwegian male sailors (sport)
Olympic sailors of Norway
Sailors at the 1972 Summer Olympics – Tempest